Kelmend may refer to:
 Kelmend (region)
 Kelmend (municipality)

See also  
 Kelmendi (tribe)